ESPN 3D was an American digital cable and satellite television channel that was owned by ESPN Inc., a joint venture between The Walt Disney Company (which operated the network, through its 80% controlling ownership interest) and the Hearst Corporation (which holds the remaining 20% interest). The channel featured 3D telecasts of sports events that ESPN held broadcast rights, and simulcasted live games from other ESPN networks on a semi-regular basis.

History
ESPN 3D launched on June 11, 2010 with a 3D broadcast of the opening match of the 2010 FIFA World Cup between South Africa and Mexico. Other programs broadcast on the channel in its first year included the 2011 BCS National Championship Game and various college football and basketball games. Early programming included 25 matches from the 2010 World Cup and the Summer X Games. Up to 85 live events were shown on the network in 2010. ESPN 3D produced 14 games from the National Basketball Association (NBA) during the 2010-11 season, including seven playoff games. The first NBA game broadcast on ESPN 3D was a December 17, 2010 match between the Miami Heat and the New York Knicks. On June 30, 2011, ESPN announced that ESPN 3D would air the first men's semi-finals match of the 2011 Wimbledon Championships live, to be followed by a tape delayed broadcast of the second men's semi-finals. On July 4, 2011, it would also air a recorded broadcast of the ladies' and men's finals. ESPN 3D also broadcast all of the games of the 2011 Little League World Series.

Originally operating as a part-time service, ESPN 3D began broadcasting 24 hours a day on February 14, 2011. ESPN 3D was shut down on September 30, 2013, citing "limited viewer adoption of 3D services".

Carriage
DirecTV, Comcast and AT&T U-verse carried ESPN 3D at its launch. Time Warner Cable reached an agreement to carry the channel a few months later and Verizon FiOS began carrying it in April 2011.

On August 1, 2011, during that year's X Games, AT&T U-verse abruptly stopped carrying ESPN 3D to its customers, citing high cost and low demand.

References

3d
Television channels and stations established in 2010
English-language television stations in the United States
3D television channels
2010 establishments in the United States
Television channels and stations disestablished in 2013